The following films were shown at the 2007 Sundance Film Festival.

Premieres

Independent Film Competition: Documentary
The 16 films below were chosen from 856 submissions by U.S. filmmakers and each film is a world premiere.

Independent Film Competition: Dramatic
The 16 films below were chosen from 996 submissions and each film is a world premiere.

World Cinema Competition: Documentary
The 16 films below were chosen from 506 submissions.

World Cinema Competition: Dramatic
The 16 films below were chosen from 929 submissions.

Frontier

Midnight

Spectrum

Sundance Collection

Shorts Program

Shorts with Features

2007 films

2007 in American cinema
2007 film festivals